Pterorhachis is a genus of flowering plants belonging to the family Meliaceae.

Its native range is Western Central Tropical Africa.

Species:

Pterorhachis letestui 
Pterorhachis zenkeri

References

Meliaceae
Meliaceae genera